Mädler may refer to:

Johann Heinrich von Mädler (1794-1874), a German astronomer; and things named for him:
65859 Mädler, an outer main-belt minor planet
Mädler (lunar crater)
Mädler (Martian crater)